Tim Gullikson and Tom Gullikson were the defending champions, but did not participate this year.

Stefan Edberg and Anders Järryd won the title, defeating Kevin Curren and Wojtek Fibak 6–3, 7–6 in the final.

Seeds

  Pavel Složil /  Tomáš Šmíd (semifinals)
  Heinz Günthardt /  Henri Leconte (semifinals)
  Stefan Edberg /  Anders Järryd (champions)
  Mark Edmondson /  Kim Warwick (first round)

Draw

Draw

External links
 ATP draw

1985 Grand Prix (tennis)
Donnay Indoor Championships